Lộc Hà is a rural district of Hà Tĩnh province in the North Central Coast region of Vietnam.

Districts of Hà Tĩnh province